Nossal may refer to:

Nossal High School, Berwick, Victoria, Australia

People with the surname
Gustav Nossal (born 1931), Australian biologist 
Kim Richard Nossal (fl. 1976–2019), Canadian educator
Nancy Goldman Nossal (1937–2006),  American molecular biologist

See also
 Nossa, a genus of moths